Valdemar Axel Firsoff FRAS was known principally as an amateur astronomer. He was born on 29 January 1912 in Bila Tserkva, Russian Empire, and died on 19 November 1981. He lived in Lochearnhead, Scotland, before moving to Somerset, England, where he settled in Glastonbury.

Biography

Axel Firsoff held an MA degree in languages and worked as a Swedish translator and in the United Kingdom Patent Office. He was a keen mountaineer and skier, as some of his earlier books reveal, and he was a ski instructor for the British Olympic Ski Team in the 1950s. He developed an interest in science, in particular geology and astronomy and this led him to publish numerous books on the moon and inner planets.

Many of his books also touched on extraterrestrial life and the nature of the mind. In Life, Mind and Galaxies, he speculated that "mind seems to be an entity of the same order as energy and matter", an idea well before its time. Firsoff held unorthodox views, for example he did not believe in the expansion of the universe. In other aspects of his work, such as the nature of the lunar craters, which he considered to be of volcanic rather than cosmological origin, he was later proved to be well wide of the mark.

In his book Strange World of the Moon, Firsoff suggested that there are underground oceans on the moon. Astronomer G. Fielder commented in the New Scientist magazine that most astronomers would not accept this view but as the book contains interesting new ideas it is recommended to all students of the moon.

In a 1977 review for Firsoff's book The Solar Planets in the New Scientist, Ian Ridpath commented that "the author queries the now well-established 234-day rotation period of Venus, introduces the concept of superheated steam in that planet's atmosphere, and proposes seas at the Venusian poles. An inexperienced reader, seeking reliable information on our modern knowledge of the Solar System that the book promises, will not know that these views are unorthodox."

Honors
Firsoff crater, located in Meridiani Planum on the planet Mars, is named in Firsoff's honor.  Firsoff Crater is located at 2.63° North, 350.58° East.

Selected publications

 Ski Track on the Battlefield - 1942
 The Tatra Mountains - 1942
 The Unity of Europe - 1947
 The Cairngorms on Foot and Ski - 1949
 Arran With Camera and Sketchbook - 1951
 Our Neighbor Worlds - 1953
 In the Hills of Breadalbane: Illustrated from the author's photos and drawings - 1954
 Moon Atlas - 1961
 The Surface of the Moon - 1961
 Strange World of the Moon - 1962
 The Crust Of The Earth - 1962
 Life Beyond the Earth: A Study in Exobiology - 1963
 Facing the Universe - 1966
 Life, Mind and Galaxies - 1967
 The Interior Planets - 1968
 The Old Moon and the New - 1969
 The World of Mars - 1969
 Gemstones of the British Isles - 1971
 Life among the Stars - 1974
 Working with Gemstones - 1974
 The Rockhound's Handbook - 1975
 The Solar Planets - 1977
 At the Crossroads of Knowledge - 1977
 The New Face of Mars - 1982

References 

Sources
 Patrick Moore (1982), Obituary, Quarterly Journal of the Royal Astronomical Society, Volume 23, pp. 629–630.
 Martin Mobberley (2018), The strange world of V. Axel Firsoff (1910−1981), Journal of the British Astronomical Association, Volume 128, pp. 141–156.
 Preface in Life, Mind and Galaxies (1967)
 Second-hand book web-sites including Amazon
Notes

1981 deaths
1910 births
Amateur astronomers
20th-century British astronomers
Philosophical cosmologists
Soviet emigrants to the United Kingdom